In Mandaeism, Nṣab is an uthra (angel or guardian). He is also called Nṣab Rba ("the Great Nṣab") or Nṣab Ziwa ("the Radiant Nṣab" or "Splendid Plant"). Nṣab and Anan-Nṣab ('cloud of Nṣab', a female consort) are frequently mentioned together as a pair in the Right Ginza and Qolasta.

In the Mandaean Book of John

In chapters 3 to 10 of the Mandaean Book of John, Nṣab is a son of Yushamin.

In the fourth chapter, Nṣab Ziwa admonishes his father Yushamin over his rebellion.

The eighth chapter gives an account of Nṣab bringing a petition for forgiveness for Yushamin to the King of Light (malka ḏ-nhura), who accepts it against the wishes of Manda d-Hayyi, and cautions the latter for hating Yushamin for refusing him a wife. The ninth is a dialogue between Yushamin, Manda d-Hayyi and Nṣab; the tenth is a monologue by Yushamin.

In other Mandaean scriptures
Nṣab is mentioned in chapters 8 and 17.1 of the Right Ginza. He is also mentioned in Qolasta prayers 25, 71, 105, 145, 168, 186, 353, and 379.

See also
Nbat
Titanomachy
List of angels in theology

References

Individual angels
Uthras
Mandaean given names